Lamprosema angulinea is a moth in the family Crambidae. It was described by Schaus in 1913. It is found in Costa Rica.

References

Moths described in 1913
Lamprosema
Moths of Central America